The Muogamarra Nature Reserve is a protected nature reserve that is located in the Sydney region of New South Wales, in eastern Australia.

Features
The vegetation is mainly dry sclerophyll forest and shrubs on rocky areas, as well as mangroves along the river.

The reserve is closed to the public for most of the year, and opens for six weekends each year in spring, when there are prolific displays of wildflowers. At other times of the year it is available to groups such as the scouts or to schools for education or special events. During the weekends that the reserve is open to the public, volunteers provide guided walks around some of the trails.

The reserve facilities include an unsealed carpark, toilets, a small open grassy area and the main information centre. An entry fee applies.

Aboriginal sites
There are many Aboriginal sites in the Muogamarra Nature Reserve, especially rock art engravings and grinding grooves.

History

In 1836 George Peat was granted  on the Hawkesbury River at what is now Peats Bight. He built huts and a wharf there, and farmed his land. A dairy farm was then built nearby at Peats Crater. Founded by John Duncan Tipper in 1934 when he leased  to protect the flora, fauna and aboriginal sites, due to his concern at the loss of Hawkesbury sandstone forest. He named the site 'Muogamarra', which he believed was an aboriginal Awabakal word meaning "preserve for the future." This area was at the northern end of what is now the nature reserve. In 1954 the land was given up by Tipper and gazetted as Muogamarra Sanctuary.

The  Sir Edward Hallstrom Faunal Reserve was dedicated in 1961 in what is now the southern part of the nature reserve. This was the work of Allen Strom and Sir Edward Hallstrom. In March 1969 the two areas were amalgamated into what is now Muogamarra Nature Reserve, under the control of the NSW National Parks and Wildlife Service.

Walks
The Muogamarra Nature Reserve has several short day walks, beginning at the main information centre: 
Point LoopA short, flat loop   walk from the carpark, with wildflowers. Goes to a viewpoint over Peats Crater and the Hawkesbury River.
J. D. Tipper LoopA short mostly flat   walk to the lookout named for the founder of Muogamarra Nature Reserve views overlooking .
Lloyd TrigA slightly longer mostly flat   walk on an old road built by convict labour to Lloyd Trig Point, with views of the Hawkesbury River area.
Peats CraterA fairly long  walk with a  descent and matching ascent which follows a convict road to the site of George Peat's farm at Peats Crater, which is also a geological feature.
Bird Gully SwampA trail which skirts the edge of a 'hanging swamp' containing a unique plant habitat. Also goes to the top of a waterfall and occupation sites of aboriginal Gu-ring-gai people.

See also

 Protected areas of New South Wales

References

External links
 Free online topographic maps of Muogamarra – NSW Dept of Lands Spatial Portal this is not accessible since 2014
 
  [CC-By-SA]

Nature reserves in New South Wales
Protected areas established in 1960
Rock art in Australia
1960 establishments in Australia
Hawkesbury River
Geography of Sydney